Rattanaporn Sanuanram (born April 9, 1980) is a retired Thai indoor volleyball player of Supreme Chonburi. She is a current member of the Thailand women's national volleyball team.

Career
Rattanaporn played the 2014/15 season with the Thai club Bangkok.

Clubs
  Phuket (2006)
  Chiang Rai VC (2010)
  Quang Ninh VC (2011-2012)
  Ayutthaya A.T.C.C (2013–2014)
  Bangkok (2014–2015)
  Supreme Chonburi (2015–2017)

Awards

Individual
 2006 Thailand League "Best Spiker
 2010 Thailand League "Best Spiker"
 2014–15 Thailand League "Best Middle Blocker"

Clubs 
 2006 Thailand League -  Runner-Up, with Phuket
 2013 Thai-Denmark Super League -  Bronze medal, with Ayutthaya A.T.C.C
 2013–14 Thailand League -   3rd place, with Ayutthaya A.T.C.C
 2016–17 Thailand League -  Champion, with Supreme Chonburi
 2017 Thai-Denmark Super League -  Champion, with Supreme Chonburi
 2017 Asian Club Championship -  Champion, with Supreme Chonburi

References

External links
 FIVB Biography

1980 births
Living people
Rattanaporn Sanuanram
Rattanaporn Sanuanram
Volleyball players at the 2006 Asian Games
Rattanaporn Sanuanram
Southeast Asian Games medalists in volleyball
Competitors at the 2005 Southeast Asian Games
Competitors at the 2007 Southeast Asian Games
Rattanaporn Sanuanram
Rattanaporn Sanuanram
Rattanaporn Sanuanram